Falak-ol-Aflak or Shapur Khast Castle is a castle situated on the top of a large hill with the same name within the city of Khorramabad, the regional capital of Lorestan province, Iran. This gigantic structure was built during the Sassanid era (224–651).

The Khorramabad River runs past the eastern and south-western side of the Falak-ol-Aflak hill providing the fortress some natural protection on those sides. Today, the western and northern sides of the hill are bordered by the residential districts of Khorramabad.

History
Falak-ol-Aflak castle is amongst the most important structures built during the Sassanid era. It has been known by a number of names since it was built over 1800 years ago. Recorded names have referred to it as Shapur-Khast or Sabr-Khast fortress, Dezbaz, Khoramabad castle, and ultimately the Falak-ol-Aflak Castle.

Under the Pahlavi dynasty, after being used as a prison until 1968, it was transformed into a museum complex.

Architectural layout
The height of the entire structure, including the hill, reaches to 40 meters above the surrounding area.

This space is divided into four large halls, and their associated rooms and corridors. The rooms all surround two courtyards with the following measurements: the first courtyard measures  and the second . When originally built the castle used to have 12 towers, but only eight remain standing today.

The building's entrance is situated towards the north, within the body of the northwestern tower.

The water well of the fortress lies in the area behind the first courtyard. Reaching a depth of 40 meters, the majority of the well's shaft is carved into the rock in order to reach the source of the Golestan spring. The well remains usable to this day.

The materials used in the construction of the fortress are mud-bricks, mud-fired bricks, stone, wood, and mortar.

Surrounding structures 
Archaeological studies have identified the existence of a two layered rampart with twelve towers around the present day construction. This surrounding rampart mainly stretched westward. From the twelve original towers, only two remain and these are situated northwest and southwest of the existing fortress.

Dehumidifier 
Falak ol-Aflak Castle appears to have been built with a dehumidifier system.

Previously, the experts believed these dehumidifier canals with a height of more than 1 meter covering all the area beneath the castle were hide-outs for the residents. But in reality, due to being aware of the changing climate in the region and the underground waters, the Sassanid engineers have equipped the castle with a dehumidifier.

Falak ol-Aflak castle is made with different materials like stone and wood that are vulnerable to humidity. That is why the castle was built on the highest point of the city of Khoram-abad, so that the wind could penetrate the building and dry its foundations.

Current status
The castle is managed by the Iran Cultural Heritage Organisation and a protected site.

See also
Sassanid architecture
Iranian architecture

References

External links

 Lorestan Province Cultural Heritage Organization

Buildings and structures completed in 651
Sasanian castles
Castles in Iran
Prisons in Iran
Military history of Iran
Tourist attractions in Lorestan Province
3rd-century fortifications
Buildings and structures in Khorramabad
Tourist attractions in Khorramabad
National works of Iran